XHTA-FM (branded as Dinámica 94.5 FM) is a Latin urban-formatted FM radio station, broadcasting on 94.5 MHz FM in Piedras Negras, Coahuila, Mexico.

History
XHTA received its concession on October 15, 1970. It was owned by Tomás García Jiménez, who founded Señales de Oro ("Golden Signals"), a radio system that grew to five stations in northern Coahuila; he also owned a flower shop, funeral parlor and furniture store.

References

Radio stations in Coahuila
Mass media in Piedras Negras, Coahuila
1970 establishments in Mexico